Syrianska KF is a Swedish football club located in Norrköping.

Background
Syrianska KF currently plays in Division 4 Östergötland Östra which is the sixth tier of Swedish football. They play their home matches at the Navestad IP in Norrköping.

The club is affiliated to Östergötlands Fotbollförbund.

Season to season

Footnotes

External links
 Syrianska KF – Official website
 Syrianska KF on Facebook

Sport in Östergötland County
Football clubs in Östergötland County
Association football clubs established in 1977
Assyrian football clubs
Assyrian/Syriac football clubs in Sweden
1977 establishments in Sweden
Diaspora sports clubs